, is a 1976 Japanese film directed by . It was Hiroshi Tachi's first starring role..

Plot
Mizoguchi is an ex-boxer who killed an opponent during a fight. He is brought into a school to deal with a gang of disruptive students led by Kitajo.

Cast
Yūsaku Matsuda : Mizoguchi
Hiroshi Tachi　： Kitajo
Yukari Yamamoto
Maria Anzai
Kazumi Murakami
Hideo Murota : Math teacher
Nenji Kobayashi : Odagiri
Tetsuro Tamba : Father of Kitajo

References

External links

1976 films
1970s Japanese-language films
Toei Company films
Films scored by Shunsuke Kikuchi
1970s Japanese films